Ionthas thirkelli is a moth of the subfamily Arctiinae first described by Fraser in 1961. It is found in Australia (New South Wales).

References

Moths described in 1961
Lithosiini